Enrico Dell'Amore (born 3 December 1973) is an Italian modern pentathlete. He competed in the men's individual event at the 2004 Summer Olympics.

References

1973 births
Living people
Italian male modern pentathletes
Olympic modern pentathletes of Italy
Modern pentathletes at the 2004 Summer Olympics
Sportspeople from Rome
21st-century Italian people